Wolfram Goertz (born 1961) is a German journalist, musician and musicologist. He coordinates the special outpatient clinic for musician medicine at the University Hospital of Düsseldorf.

Education 
Goertz was born in Mönchengladbach. He completed courses in choral conducting with Herbert Schernus (Cologne) and Eric Ericson (Stockholm).

Work 
Since 1978 he has written music and theatre reviews, among others for the Süddeutsche Zeitung, Neue Zürcher Zeitung, various radio stations and since 1998 also for Die Zeit. Since 1989, he has been music editor of the Rheinische Post in Düsseldorf.
In 2004, he conducted the world premiere of Alvin Curran's choral composition Music Is Not Music (text by John Cage) with the SWR Vokalensemble Stuttgart. As an organist, he has performed in Germany, the Netherlands, Belgium, France, Switzerland, Italy and Finland.

Goertz is also a member of the jury at major music competitions, including the Preis der deutschen Schallplattenkritik, at the State Choir Competition of the  NRW and at the International Düsseldorf Organ Festival.

At the Robert Schumann Hochschule Düsseldorf, Goertz worked as a lecturer in interpretive analysis, orchestral repertoire and choral conducting.

In 2009, he presented his doctoral thesis on "Strategies of an anxiety-relieving music accompanying therapy during cardiac catheter examinations" for the degree of Dr. rer. medic. at the Medical Faculty of RWTH Aachen.

Awards 
 1994: Förderpreis für Literatur der Landeshauptstadt Düsseldorf
 2009: Preis für Wissenschaftsjournalismus der Deutsche Gesellschaft für Kardiologie
 2012: Medienpreis des Berufsverbandes der deutschen Augenärzte für sein Buch "Augen-Sprechstunde".

Publications 
 2000: Klassik scheibchenweise – 100 CD-Tipps für Musikfreunde, 
 2002: Klassik scheibchenweise 2, 
 2006: Wolfram Goertz among others: Martha Argerich lesen & hören, DIE ZEIT Klassik Edition. 
 2009: Strategien einer angstlösenden Musikbegleittherapie bei Herzkatheteruntersuchungen, Shaker Verlag, Aachen, 
 2011: Wolfram Goertz among others: Augen-Sprechstunde, Springer-Verlag Berlin Heidelberg.

References

External links 
 

20th-century German physicians
20th-century German journalists
German music journalists
1961 births
Living people
People from Mönchengladbach